László Orbán (December 9, 1949 – July 15, 2009) was an amateur boxer from Hungary, who won the silver medal in the lightweight division (– 60 kg) at the 1972 Summer Olympics in Munich, West Germany. In the final he was defeated by Poland's Jan Szczepański on points, (5:0).

1972 Olympic results
Below are the results of László Orbán, a lightweight boxer from Hungary who competed at the 1972 Munich Olympics:

 Round of 64: defeated Mohamed Sourour (Morocco) on points, 5-0
 Round of 32: defeated Giambattista Capretti (Italy) on points, 4-1
 Round of 16: defeated Ivan Mikhailov (Bulgaria) on points, 4-1
 Quarterfinal: defeated Kim Tai-Ho (South Korea) on points, 4-1
 Semifinal: defeated Alfonso Perez (Colombia) on points, 3-2
 Final: lost to Jan Szczepanski (Poland) on points, 0-5 (awarded silver medal)

References

 Olympian Database

1949 births
2009 deaths
Lightweight boxers
Boxers at the 1972 Summer Olympics
Olympic boxers of Hungary
Olympic silver medalists for Hungary
Olympic medalists in boxing
Hungarian male boxers
Medalists at the 1972 Summer Olympics
People from Szekszárd
Sportspeople from Tolna County
20th-century Hungarian people